Israel Gutierrez (born June 26, 1977) is a sports reporter for ESPN. Before joining the staff at ESPN, he worked for the Miami Herald as well as The Palm Beach Post.

He has covered the Miami Heat for both newspapers. A South Florida native and University of Florida graduate, he also has covered the Florida Marlins. Gutierrez is of Dominican descent.

Early years
While attending the University of Florida in Gainesville, he was a staff writer for the student newspaper Independent Florida Alligator. Prior to that, he attended North Miami Senior High.

Career
He has appeared as a sports commentator on ESPN2's ESPN First Take as part of 1st and 10 with Jay Crawford and Skip Bayless.

On March 1, 2004, he debuted on Around the Horn. The following day he recorded his first win against Kevin Blackistone. As of July 2008, he has become a recurring panelist on the show. He did not appear for over two years before making his return on August 1, 2012, picking up a gold medal in the Around the Horn Summer Games by defeating Max Kellerman.

In November, 2008, Gutierrez began appearing on ESPN's The Sports Reporters and was a regular panelist until the show's demise. His work at the Miami Herald continues to receive national attention, including regular mentions on USsportspages.com.

He was a regular guest host on the Dan LeBatard Show and Highly Questionable, as well as other ESPN radio shows. Gutierrez also co-hosted on the radio show Izzy and Spain with ESPN reporter Sarah Spain.

References

External links
 Miami Herald  columnists
 Controversial Duke/Coach K column from 3-30-10 Miami Herald

American columnists
University of Florida alumni
Living people
1977 births
ESPN people
Miami Herald people
National Basketball Association broadcasters
American LGBT journalists
American gay writers